The Grovii or Gravii were an ancient Gallaeci tribe who inhabited the low valley of the Minho river, present day Portugal and Galicia (Spain), and also along the coast near the rivers "Avo" (the Ave river), Celadus, Nebis and Limia, northern Portugal.

Origin and History
Pomponius Mela stated that all the people living along the coast of Gallaecia were Celtic, with the exception of the Grovii, while Pliny wrote that they had a Greek origin. Anyhow, E.R. Luján, studying their onomastics, couldn't conclude on their non-Celtiness, since their anthroponyms and toponyms could be Celtic.

Their main settlement was Tude, present day Tui, Pontevedra, by the border with Portugal along the Minho river. The non-localized oppida of Avobriga and Lambriaca were located near the Grovii lands.

See also

Pre-Roman peoples of the Iberian Peninsula

References

External links
Detailed map of the Pre-Roman Peoples of Iberia (around 200 BC)

Tribes of Gallaecia
Ancient peoples of Portugal
Ancient peoples of Spain